Syringantha is a genus of flowering plants belonging to the family Rubiaceae.

Its native range is Northeastern Mexico.

Species:

Syringantha coulteri

References

Rubiaceae
Rubiaceae genera